Gyula Lengyel (born 20 September 1931) is a Hungarian coxswain. He competed at the 1960 Summer Olympics in Rome with the men's coxed four where they came sixth.

References

External links
 

1931 births
Possibly living people
Hungarian male rowers
Olympic rowers of Hungary
Rowers at the 1960 Summer Olympics
Rowers from Budapest
Coxswains (rowing)
European Rowing Championships medalists